The 1905 Normanton by-election was held on 27 November 1905 after the incumbent Liberal-Labour MP William Parrott died. The seat was retained by the Liberal-Labour candidate Frederick Hall.  Hall was a local councilor and chairman of the Rawmarsh School Board. who was sponsored by the Miners Federation of Great Britain and would in 1909 take the Labour whip. Hall was unopposed.

References

By-elections to the Parliament of the United Kingdom in West Yorkshire constituencies
Unopposed by-elections to the Parliament of the United Kingdom in English constituencies
1905 elections in the United Kingdom
1905 in England
November 1905 events
1900s in Yorkshire